Zainab Chaudry is an American Muslim civil rights and political activist. She is the Maryland Director for the Council on American–Islamic Relations (CAIR).

Education
Chaudry holds a Doctor of Pharmacy degree from the University of Maryland.

Career

In 2015, Chaudry became the first Muslim appointed to the Maryland State Advisory Committee to the U.S. Commission on Civil Rights – an independent, bipartisan agency established by Congress in 1957 that advises the President and Congress on civil rights matters.

She was a 'Nominated Changemaker' at the 2016 White House Summit on the United State of Women. Additionally, she was recognized as one of the Baltimore Sun's 25 'Women to Watch' in 2016.

Working with the Maryland Commission on Civil Rights and the Maryland Governor's Office on Community Initiatives, Chaudry organized Maryland's first statewide emergency preparedness summit for interfaith leaders. She is the Maryland Director for the Council on American–Islamic Relations (CAIR).

References

External links 
Official website

American Muslims
American Muslim activists
Living people
Year of birth missing (living people)
American civil rights activists
American political activists
University of Maryland, College Park alumni